Diversion, Diversions or The Diversion may refer to:

Arts and entertainment
 Diversion (film), a 1980 British television film adapted into the 1987 movie Fatal Attraction
 Diversion (play), a 1927 work by John Van Druten
 The Diversion, a 2001 novel by K. A. Applegate
 Diversion Books, an American publisher
 Diversions (album), a 1987 jazz album
 Diversions, former name of the National Dance Company Wales
 Diversions Entertainment, manufacturer of One Must Fall video game

Transport
 Diversion airport, an airport designated for an emergency landing
 Traffic diversion, the rerouting of traffic
 Yamaha Diversion, a motorcycle manufactured by Yamaha

Other uses
 Diversion dam, the rerouting of water
 Diversion program, criminal justice scheme usually for minor offenses
 Drug diversion, the transfer of legally prescribed controlled pharmaceuticals to other individuals
 Product diversion, the sale of products in unintended markets
 Weapons diversion, the loss or theft of weapons and ammunition

See also
 
 Decoy
 Distraction
 Red herring

ru:Диверсия
sl:Diverzija